The year 1641 in music involved some significant events.

Events 
Heinrich Bach becomes organist of St Mary's Church, Arnstadt.
Franz Tunder succeeds Peter Hasse as organist of the Marienkirche in Lübeck.

Publications 
Benedetto Ferrari – , volume 3, published in Venice
Claudio Monteverdi –   (Venice: Bartolomeo Magni)
Cornelis Padbrué
 (Amsterdam, Broer Jansz)
Synphonia in nuptias... (Amsterdam, Broer Jansz), written to celebrate the marriage of Everswyn and Lucia Buys

Classical music 
Johann Schop – Werde munter, mein Gemüte

Opera 
Francesco Cavalli – 
Claudio Monteverdi – , premiered in Venice

Births 
October 14 – Joachim Tielke, German maker of musical instruments (died 1719)

Deaths 
date unknown
Estêvão de Brito, Portuguese composer of polyphony (born c. 1570)
Robert Dowland, lutenist and composer (born c.1591)
probable – Francesco Usper, Italian composer and organist (born c. 1570)